MTV Unplugged: Korn is an acoustic live album by American nu metal band Korn, released worldwide on March 5, 2007, and on the following day in the United States.

Album information
The performance, part of the MTV Unplugged series, took place in MTV studios in Times Square, New York City on December 9, 2006, in front of a crowd of approximately fifty people. It was the band's first and only live album recorded as a three piece band since drummer David Silveria departed the group earlier that month.

The MTV concert was Korn's second televised acoustic performance, after appearing on Jimmy Kimmel Live! on July 18, 2006.

The show was broadcast online on MTV.com on February 23, 2007, and was broadcast on television networks in America, Europe and Asia from March 2, 2007.

The exclusive acoustic set had the participation of other big-name artists including the Cure and Amy Lee. Additionally, Korn were joined by an array of instrumentalists and touring musicians, including guitarist Rob Patterson, backup vocalist Kalen Chase, keyboardist Zac Baird, and percussionist Michael Jochum.

The album debuted on the U.S. Billboard 200 at #9, with about 51,000 copies sold in its first week, and experienced 55% decline in sales in the following week.

Richard Gibbs comments on the album
On December 24, 2006, Richard Gibbs made following statement on his message board:

Track listing

B-sides
 "No One's There"
 "Thoughtless"
 "Dirty" (MTV Virtual Hills leak) (also on the Japanese edition of the album)

Additional content 
The album's booklet contained a special code which granted owners of the recording an opportunity for an exclusive preview of Korn's then forthcoming studio album.

Personnel 
Credits adapted from the album's liner notes.

Korn
 Jonathan Davis – lead vocals
 Fieldy – bass
 Munky – guitar

Additional musicians
 Rob Patterson – additional guitars
 Kalen Musmecci – backing vocals, percussion
 Michael Jochum – percussion
 Zac Baird – keys
 Jeremy Turner, Evie Koh, Julie Green, Erik Friedlander – cello
 Bill Ellison, Jeff Carney – upright bass
 Mike Davis, Jeff Nelson – trombone
 Dale Struckenbruck – musical saw
 Bill Hayes – glass harmonica
 Morris Kainuma, Andy Bove – cimbasso
 Hana Yoshikawa, Heather McPherson, Wynn Yamami, Midori Yasuda, Alan Okada, Merle Okada – taiko drums

Production
 Produced by Richard Gibbs and Korn
 Produced and Directed for MTV by Alex Coletti
 Musical direction and arrangements by Richard Gibbs
 Recorded by John Harris
 Assisted by Peter Gary, Max Feldman, AJ Maynard
 Additional Engineers – Vini Cirilli and Csaba Petcocz
 Second Engineer – Jorge Costa
 Assisted by Nick O'Toole
 Mixed by Terry Date
 Mastered by Stephen Marcussen
 Audio Post Production – Christopher Koch

Chart positions

Album

Singles

See also

References

2007 live albums
Korn albums
Mtv Unplugged (Korn album)
Virgin Records live albums